This is a list of caves in Puerto Rico.

Aguas Buenas Cave System
Cavernas del Río Camuy
Cueva de Los Indios
Cueva del Indio
Cueva del Indio (Arecibo)
Cueva La Espiral
Cueva Lucero
Cueva Sorbeto
Cueva Ventana
Cuevas Las Cabachuelas
Pozo de Jacinto

Puerto Rico
Puerto Rico
Puerto Rico-related lists